News Is My Business is an online newspaper covering business topics related to Puerto Rico. The newspaper was founded by Michelle Kantrow, a recipient of an Overseas Press Club award. The newspaper is listed by the Puerto Rico Government Development Bank as an "english language source of news on Puerto Rico" and is often cited as a news source by several organizations including the Puerto Rico Products Association, Connect Puerto Rico, Voxxi, Metro International, El Nuevo Día, and the Puerto Rico Center for the New Economy.

References

Notes

External links
 newsismybusiness.com - official site

Puerto Rican news websites